Littleton–Downtown station (sometimes styled as Littleton•Downtown) is a RTD light rail station in Littleton, Colorado, United States. Operating as part of the D Line, the station was opened on July 14, 2000, and is operated by the Regional Transportation District.

References

RTD light rail stations
Littleton, Colorado
Stations along Denver and Rio Grande Western Railroad lines
Railway stations in the United States opened in 2000